The 1895 Ohio gubernatorial election was held on November 5, 1895. Republican nominee Asa S. Bushnell defeated Democratic nominee James E. Campbell with 51.00% of the vote.

General election

Candidates
Major party candidates
Asa S. Bushnell, Republican 
James E. Campbell, Democratic

Other candidates
Jacob S. Coxey Sr., People's
Seth H. Ellis, Prohibition
William Watkins, Socialist Labor

Results

References

1895
Ohio
1895 Ohio elections